Township 8 is a township in Rooks County, Kansas, United States. Palco is the largest population center in Township 8.

History
Rooks County was established with four townships: Bow Creek, Lowell, Paradise and Stockton. That number increased to seven by 1878 and twenty three in 1925. The twenty three townships were in place until 1971 when the number was reduced to the current twelve townships.

Township 8 was formed by renaming Northampton Township in 1971. While other Rooks County townships were combined pursuant to Kansas Statute 80-1110, Northampton was just renamed using the new naming standard.

Northampton Township
Northampton Township was established in 1879 from part of Plainville Township. Plainville Township was composed of territory from the original Paradise Township.

References

Townships in Rooks County, Kansas
Townships in Kansas